Places called Espanola or Española include:

 Espanola, Florida, United States
 Espanola, Washington, United States
 Española Island, one of the Galápagos Islands
 Española, New Mexico, United States
 Espanola, Ontario, Canada
 Hispaniola, an island known in Spanish as La Española
 Sofronio Española, Palawan, a municipality in the Philippines